Maria Manuel Leitão Marques (born 23 August 1952) is a Portuguese politician of the Socialist Party who has been serving as Member of the European Parliament since 2019. She previously served as Minister of the Presidency and of Administrative Modernisation . From 2015 until 2019, she represented the Viseu constituency in the Assembly of the Republic. Marques was the Secretary of State for the Administrative Modernization under the XVIII and XVII Constitutional Government of Portugal.

In the 2019 European elections, Leitão Marques ran on the list of Prime Minister António Costa's Socialist Party. She has since been serving as vice chair of the Committee on the Internal Market and Consumer Protection. In addition to her committee assignments, she is a member of the European Parliament Intergroup on Artificial Intelligence and Digital.

References

1952 births
Living people
Government ministers of Portugal
Women government ministers of Portugal
Socialist Party (Portugal) politicians
MEPs for Portugal 2019–2024